"Misunderstanding" is a song by English rock band Genesis, released on their 1980 album Duke. It reached No. 14 in the U.S. and No. 42 in the UK. Its highest charting was in Canada, where it reached No. 1 and is ranked as the seventh biggest Canadian hit of 1980. It was also featured on the band's 1982 double-album Three Sides Live, where it led off side three.

History
Originally written by Phil Collins during the production of his debut solo album Face Value, the song ended up being donated (along with "Please Don't Ask") for Duke. The original demo without lyrics was later included on the 2016 reissue of that album. According to Collins, the song was modelled after The Beach Boys' "Sail On, Sailor", Sly and the Family Stone's "Hot Fun in the Summertime" and Toto's "Hold the Line". Tony Banks said of the song: "All three of us were fans of The Beach Boys, so when Phil brought the song to the writing sessions, we thought it would be a fun one to work on. It has a California, summertime, surfer vibe to it that was unlike anything else we'd worked on in the past."

Record World called it "loveable and instantly consumable on AOR-pop."

Music video
A music video, directed by Stuart Orme, was made for the song, featuring Tony Banks and Mike Rutherford playing their instruments (piano and electric guitar respectively) on the back of a truck, with a bearded Collins driving a 1950s model Ford convertible making stops at various locations around Los Angeles (the Capitol Records Tower can be seen in the background and street signs for Hollywood Boulevard are present) looking for his girlfriend (played by Max Factor spokesperson Linda Kendall).

Two different cuts of the video exist: one version featured alternate shots of Collins, as well as alternate shots of his girlfriend peppered throughout (including a shot of her at Griffith Park Observatory). This version was not used on any of the Genesis Music Video collections. Filming took place on location in Los Angeles from 24–27 May 1980 during concerts for the band's Duke tour there. Further evidence of the filming dates for the video are the billboards seen throughout, advertising The Hollywood Knights and The Nude Bomb, both films released in May 1980.

Tour information
The song was featured on the U.S. leg of the Duke Tour of 1980, and was also featured on tours to promote future albums Abacab and Genesis. Despite its commercial success, it was dropped from the setlists of all the later tours until 2021. However a verse was sung sometimes in the We Can't Dance Tour's "Old Medley." Collins also played the song in its entirety with a horn section in the U.S. during his First Final Farewell Tour in 2004. The song returned to live performance at the opening night of the North American leg of The Last Domino? tour at Chicago's United Center on November 15, 2021.

Chart history

Weekly charts

Year-end charts

Personnel 
 Phil Collins – vocals, drums, percussion
 Tony Banks – keyboards
 Mike Rutherford – electric guitar, bass guitar

References

1980 singles
Genesis (band) songs
Songs written by Phil Collins
1980 songs
Charisma Records singles
Virgin Records singles
Atlantic Records singles